Noli is a coast comune of Liguria, Italy, in the Province of Savona, it is about  southwest of Genoa by rail, about  above sea-level.  The origin of the name may come from Neapolis, meaning "new city" in Greek.

From 1192 to 1797 Noli was one of the maritime republics, the Republic of Noli.

Geography
The bounding communes of Noli are Finale Ligure, Spotorno and Vezzi Portio.

History

The Republic of Noli was an independent republic from 1193 until 1797. In 1239 it became seat of a bishop; later on the diocese was united with that of Savona as the Diocese of Savona-Noli. The Napoleonic invasion in 1797 put an end to Noli's sovereignty.

Main sights

 Romanesque basilica of S. Paragorio (11th century)
 Household and annexed Tower (14th-15th century)
 San Paragorio (5th–6th century) 
 Tower and Gate Papone (13th-14th centuries)
 Tower of Four Sides.
Nemo's Garden (Noli)

Twin towns — sister cities
Noli is twinned with:

  Langenargen, Germany (2005)

Personalities
António de Noli, Italian nobleman and explorer, discoverer of some Guinea territories and Cape Verde islands on behalf of the Portuguese crown. Born in Genoa 1419, "family with origins in Noli or the Castle of Noli".

References

External links

 Photographs of Noli

Cities and towns in Liguria
Maritime republics